Weerawat Jiraphaksiri (born May 18, 1994) is a Thai professional footballer who plays for Thai League 2 club Udon Thani.

References

External links
 

1994 births
Living people
Weerawat Jiraphaksiri
Association football defenders
Weerawat Jiraphaksiri
Weerawat Jiraphaksiri
Weerawat Jiraphaksiri
Weerawat Jiraphaksiri